Luis Ángel Maté Mardones (born 23 March 1984) is a Spanish professional road bicycle racer, who currently rides for UCI ProTeam .

Major results

2005
 1st Stage 5a Circuito Montañés
2007
 1st Stage 5 Circuito Montañés
2009
 5th Prueba Villafranca de Ordizia
 9th Gran Premio Industria e Commercio Artigianato Carnaghese
2010
 1st Stage 6 Tour de San Luis
 8th Gran Premio Città di Camaiore
 9th Trofeo Melinda
2011
 1st Stage 4 Route du Sud
2012
 Vuelta a Andalucía
1st  Mountains classification
1st  Sprints classification
2013
 5th Vuelta a Murcia
2014
 2nd Grand Prix de Plumelec-Morbihan
 4th Vuelta a Murcia
 8th Clásica de Almería
 10th Overall Vuelta a Andalucía
 Combativity award Stage 6 Tour de France
2015
 6th Grand Prix de Plumelec-Morbihan
2016
 9th Overall Route du Sud
 Vuelta a España
 Combativity award Stages 7, 10 & 16
2017
 6th Overall Tour de Luxembourg
 Vuelta a España
 Combativity award Stages 7 & 14
2018
 Vuelta a España
Held  after Stages 2–16
 Combativity award Stages 2 & 4
2021
 1st  Mountains classification, Vuelta a Andalucía
 6th Overall Volta a la Comunitat Valenciana
 8th Overall Troféu Joaquim Agostinho
2022
  Combativity award Stage 16 Vuelta a España

Grand Tour general classification results timeline

References

External links

Cofidis profile

Cycling Quotient profile

Spanish male cyclists
1984 births
Living people
Cyclists from Madrid
People from Marbella
Sportspeople from the Province of Málaga
Cyclists from Andalusia